Bhavanapadu is a village and panchayat in Santha Bommali mandal of Srikakulam district. It is located in Coastal Andhra region of Andhra Pradesh, India. There are fishing harbor and beach at Bhavanapadu village.

Demographics 

The total population constitute,  males,  females and  children, in the age group of 0–6 years. The average literacy rate stands at 50.26% with  literates, significantly lower than the national average of 73.00%.

References

Villages in Srikakulam district